This list of theaters and entertainment venues in Washington, D.C. includes present-day opera houses and theaters, cabarets, music halls and other places of live entertainment in Washington, D.C.

Current theaters

Producing theaters

Adventure Theatre 
Ambassador Theater at Flashpoint 
Arena Stage at the Mead Center for American Theater - Recipient of the 1976 Regional Theatre Tony Award 
Fichandler Stage
Kreeger Theater
The Kogod Cradle
Capital Fringe Festival, with annual, temporary venues 
Capitol Steps
Charter Theater at Theatre on the Run (folded 2011) 
Constellation Theatre Company
Damascus Theatre Company
DC Improv 
Discovery Theater at the Smithsonian Ripley Center
Folger Theatre at the Elizabethan Theatre 
Forum Theatre 
GALA Hispanic Theatre at the Tivoli Theatre
Glaser-Luchs Studio Theater at the National Conservatory of the Dramatic Arts
Hexagon at the Duke Ellington School
Histrio (Theater), A French Theater
Olney Theatre Center for the Arts
Keegan Theatre
Mosaic Theater Company of DC
Rorschach Theatre
Round House Theatre
Shakespeare Theatre Company at the Harman Center for the Arts - Recipient of the 2012 Regional Theatre Tony Award 
Sidney Harman Hall
Lansburgh Theatre
Signature Theatre - Recipient of the 2009 Regional Theatre Tony Award
Silver Spring Stage
St Mark's Players
Studio Theatre
Mead Theatre
Milton Theatre
Metheny Theatre
Stage 4
Synetic Theater
Teatro de la Luna at Casa de la Luna
Theater J at The Cecile Goldman Theater, Morris Cafritz Center for the Arts
Theater of the First Amendment at George Mason University
Washington Audio Theater
Washington Stage Guild
Wildwood Summer Theatre
Woolly Mammoth Theatre Company

Presenting and rental theaters

Anacostia Playhouse
Atlas Performing Arts Center
Lang Theater
Sprenger Theater
Atlas Theater Lab 1
Atlas Theater Lab 2
Carter Barron Amphitheater
Church Street Theater
Corner Store, The
Dance Place
DAR Constitution Hall
D.C. Arts Center (DCAC)
Ford's Theatre
H Street Playhouse
Howard Theater
Lisner Auditorium 
Jack Guidone Theater at Joy of Motion Dance Center
John F. Kennedy Center for the Performing Arts
Kennedy Center Concert Hall
Kennedy Center Opera House
Eisenhower Theater
Family Theater
Theater Lab
Terrace Theater
Millennium Stage
KC Jazz Club
Lincoln Theatre 
Mead Theatre Lab at Flashpoint
Metro Cafe
National Theatre
National Sylvan Theater
Source Theatre
DeLaski Theater at the Sitar Arts Center
Town Hall Education, Arts & Recreation Campus (THEARC) Theater
Warehouse Theatre
Mainstage
Second Stage
Warner Theatre

Independent companies
African Continuum Theatre Company
Ambassador Theater, International Cultural Center
Artists' Initiative
banished? productions
Bouncing Ball Theatrical Productions
Brave Spirits Theatre -- Closing
Constellation Theatre Company 
Didactic Theatre Company
Doorway Arts Ensemble
dog & pony dc
Faction of Fools Theatre Company 
Federal Theatre Project 
Flying V Theatre
Forum Theatre
Ganymede Arts (formerly the Actors' Theatre of Washington)
Gross National Product Comedy - founder John Simmons 
Happenstance Theater
Horizons Theatre
Journeymen Theater Ensemble
Keegan Theatre
Lean & Hungry Theatre
Longacre Lea Productions
Madcap Players
MuseFire Productions
Now This!
Omaemoda Productions
Open Circle Theatre
Pointless Theatre Company
Quotidian Theatre Company
SCENA Theatre
Serenity Players
Solas Nua 
Spooky Action Theater
Taffety Punk Theatre Company
The In Series
The Landless Theatre Company 
The Rude Mechanicals
The Saartjie Project 
Theater Alliance 
Venus Theatre Company 
Washington Audio Theater
Washington Improv Theater
Washington National Opera
Washington Savoyards 
WSC Avant Bard, formerly Washington Shakespeare Company
Yams Theatre, Inc. 
Young Playwrights' Theater
Washington Audio Theater

Educational theater
Harold and Sylvia Greenberg Theatre, American University
Katzen Arts Center, American University
Abramson Family Recital Hall
Studio Theatre
Hartke Theatre, Catholic University of America
Elstad Auditorium, Gallaudet University 
Dorothy Betts Marvin Theatre, George Washington University
Royden B. Davis, S.J. Performing Arts Center, Georgetown University
Gonda Theatre
Devine Studio Theatre
Walsh Black Box, Georgetown University
Poulton Hall, Georgetown University
Fine Arts Complex, Howard University
Ira Aldridge Theater
Environmental Theatre Space (ETS)
Auditorium, University of the District of Columbia
The Theatre Lab School of Dramatic Arts

Non-operational theaters
Takoma Theater

Theater organizations
theatreWashington
League of Washington Theaters
Cultural Alliance of Greater Washington
Dance/Metro DC

Theater awards
Helen Hayes Awards
Mary Goldwater Award
Offstage Honors ("The Offies")
Richard Bauer Award
Ruby Griffith Award
Usher's Favorite Show Award
Washington Area Theatre Community Honors (WATCH Awards)

References

External links
 District of Columbia Historic Theatres

 
Washington, D.C.

Theater and entertainment venues
Music venues in Washington, D.C.